Cepora pactolicus is a butterfly in the family Pieridae. It is found on Borneo.

References

Pierini
Butterflies described in 1865
Butterflies of Borneo
Taxa named by Arthur Gardiner Butler